State Route 263 (SR 263) is a short north–south highway in Smith County, Tennessee. The road begins in Carthage and ends west of Defeated.

Route description 
SR 263 begins at an intersection with SR 25 in Carthage. The highway goes northward over steep and rugged terrain as it passes by Cordell Hull Dam and Lake. After passing the dam, SR 263 passes an overlook of the lake and then winds north-northeastward to its northern terminus on SR 85. SR 263 is signed as Turkey Creek Highway throughout its existence.

Major intersections

See also 
List of state routes in Tennessee

References 

263
Transportation in Smith County, Tennessee